Veit is a personal name. Notable people with the name include:

Surname
David Veit (1771–1814) was a German doctor and writer, brother of Simon Veit
Gustav Veit (1824–1903), German gynecologist and obstetrician, a native of Leobschütz
Johann Veit (1852–1917), German gynecologist
Mario Veit (born 1973), German boxer
Mauro Luis Veit (born 1983), Brazilian defensive midfielder
Philipp Veit (1793–1877), German Romantic painter
Sankt Veit (disambiguation), the German name for Saint Vitus and a number of derived names
Simon Veit (1754–1819), German merchant and banker of Jewish ancestry, first husband of Dorothea von Schlegel

Sixten Veit (born 1970), retired German football player
Stan Veit (1919–2010), entrepreneur and publisher in the early days of the personal computer industry in the United States
Václav Jindřich Veit (1806–1864), Czech composer, copyist, pianist and lawyer

Given name
Veit Amerbach, professor of theology and member of Martin Luther's entourage who converted to Catholicism
Veit Arnpeck (1440–1505), Bavarian historian
Veit Bach (1550–1578), Hungarian miller who founded the Bach family of composers and musicians
Veit Erbermann (1597–1675), German theologian and controversialist
Veit Harlan (1899–1964), German film director and actor
Veit Heiduschka (born 1938), Austrian film producer
Veit Ludwig von Seckendorff (1626–1692), German statesman and scholar
Veit Stoss (1450–1533), leading German sculptor, mostly in wood
Johann Georg Veit Engelhardt (1791–1855), German theologian

See also
Veith, a variant of Veit
FC St. Veit, Austrian football club founded in 1950
Veit v. Commissioner, in 1947 and 1949
Veidt, a surname
Sankt Veit (disambiguation), several place names

German masculine given names
German-language surnames
Surnames from given names